FK Sloga Leskovac is a football club based in Leskovac, Serbia. They compete in the Zone League South, the fourth tier of the national league system.

History
After winning the South Morava Zone League in 2005, the club played in the Serbian League East until 2008. They would spend 13 consecutive seasons in the fourth tier, including six in the Niš Zone League and seven in the Zone League South, before returning to the Serbian League East in 2021.

Honours
South Morava Zone League / Zone League South (Tier 4)
 2004–05 / 2020–21

References

External links
 Club page at Srbijasport

1946 establishments in Serbia
Association football clubs established in 1946
Football clubs in Serbia
Sport in Leskovac